Stato interessante is a 1977 Italian comedy-drama film directed by Sergio Nasca. It consists of three segments, all sharing the abortion as the main theme.

Cast

First segment 
 Janet Agren: Carla  
 Duilio Del Prete: Federico  
 Quinto Parmeggiani: Ignazio  
 Clara Colosimo: the Aunt

Second segment 
 Monica Guerritore: Annabella La Monica 
 Turi Ferro: Domenico La Monica  
 Franco Fabrizi: Gaetano La Monica
 Magali Noël: Tilde La Monica
 Laura D'Angelo: Annabella's Friend

Third segment 
 Adriana Asti: Patrizia  
 Enrico Montesano: Fernando
 Elisa Mainardi: Jolanda

References

External links

1977 films
Italian drama films
Films scored by Ennio Morricone
Films about abortion
1970s Italian-language films
1970s Italian films